The New Jersey State Championships also known as the New Jersey State Tennis Championships or New Jersey State Sectional Championships was a men's and women's tennis tournament first staged in 1882 in Newark, New Jersey USA. The tournament was played at various times on clay courts and grass courts, and ran until 1968 for women's events, and 1973 for men's events.

History
The New Jersey State Championships, was a men's and women's tennis tournament first staged in 1882 in Newark, New Jersey USA. The first winner of the men's singles was American player Joseph Sill Clark. The first known women's singles event was staged in 1889 which was one by Gertrude Williams. The final men's singles winner was Peter Fleming in 1973. The final women's singles event winner was Pat Stewart in 1968. It was a featured regular series event on the Mens Amateur Tour (1876-1967) and the Women's Amateur Tour (1876-1967).

Championship finals
Incomplete Roll

Mens Singles

Women's Singles
Incomplete Roll

References

Sources
 Player Profile: Richard Murphy". ATP Tour. ATP.   
 Player Profile: William Lurie". ATP Tour. ATP.   
 Player Profile: John Reese". ATP Tour. ATP. 
 "The Cornell Daily Sun: Sport Page". cdsun-cornell.veridiansoftware.com. Cornell University Library. 28 October 1947.
 Sclar, Ari F. (15 April 2015). Beyond Stereotypes: American Jews and Sports. West Lafayette: Purdue University Press. ISBN 978-1-61249-356-5. 
 Times, The New York (10 June 1926). "Feibleman Winner in Jersey Tennis; Reaches Round Before Semi-Finals in State Tourney by Defeating Dunham". The New York Times. 
 Waldman, Frank (1949). Famous American Athletes of Today. Boston: L.C. Page.
 Wright & Ditson Officially Adopted Lawn Tennis Guide. New York: Wright & Ditson. 1908.

Defunct tennis tournaments in the United States